Frigidoalvania brychia is a species of minute sea snail, a marine gastropod mollusk or micromollusk in the family Rissoidae.

Distribution
The species has been reported from Saguenay Fjord and Gulf of Saint Lawrence in Canada as well as the Gulf of Maine in the North Atlantic Ocean.

Description 
The maximum recorded shell length is 5 mm.

Habitat 
Minimum recorded depth is 186 m. Maximum recorded depth is 2359 m.

References

Rissoidae
Gastropods described in 1884